Paolo Bonacelli (born 28 February 1937) is an Italian actor.

He is best known for his performance as the Duke de Blangis in Pier Paolo Pasolini's final film, Salò, or the 120 Days of Sodom (1975). He was in Midnight Express (1978) as the despised prison trustee Rifki and Caligula (1979), in which he plays the role of Cassius Chaerea.

He co-starred with Roberto Benigni in the films Johnny Stecchino and Night on Earth, both from 1991.

In 1992, Bonacelli won the Nastro d'Argento for Best Supporting Actor.

Filmography 

Cadavere per signora (1964) .... Gedeon
La congiuntura (1965) .... Zenone
Super Seven Calling Cairo (1965) .... Capitano Hume (uncredited)
Le piacevoli notti (1966) .... Messenger
The Devil in Love (1966) .... Inn's customer
Il padre di famiglia (1967) .... Geometra
Sette volte sette (1968) .... (uncredited)
Lady Barbara (1970) .... Edward
Lacrime d'amore (1970) .... Cormick
Una prostituta al servizio del pubblico e in regola con le leggi dello stato (1971)
Maddalena (1971)
Io e lui (1973) .... Vladimiro
Giordano Bruno (1973)
Milarepa (1974) .... Prof. Bennet
Fatti di gente perbene (1974) .... Francesco Bonmartini
Anno uno (1974) .... Amendola
Au-delà de la peur (1975) .... Francesco Grimaldi
Salò o le 120 giornate di Sodoma (1975) .... The Duke
La banca di Monate (1975) .... Dottor Defendente Massera
Al piacere di rivederla (1976) .... L'Usuraio
Cadaveri eccellenti (1976) .... Dr. Maxia
L'eredità Ferramonti (1976) .... Paolo Furlin
Cattivi pensieri (1976) .... Antonio Marani
Per questa notte (1977)
Antonio Gramsci: i giorni del carcere (1977) .... Bocchini
Ritratto di borghesia in nero (1977) .... Paolo Mazzarini
Midnight Express (1978) .... Rifki
Cristo si è fermato a Eboli (1979) .... Don Luigi Magalone
Caligula (1979) .... Chaerea
Good News (1979) .... Gualtiero Milano
Il cappotto di Astrakan (1979) .... Ferdinando
Le Guignolo (1980) .... Kamal
Il mistero di Oberwald (1981) .... Count of Foehn
Calderón (1981)
Delitti, amore e gelosia (1982) .... Commissario Dell'Amore
I Remember Nelson (1982) .... King Ferdinando
Il cavaliere, la morte e il diavolo (1983) .... Nicholas
Enrico IV (1984) .... Belcredi
Sole nudo (1984) .... Il cameriere
Non ci resta che piangere (1985) .... Leonardo da Vinci
Mamma Ebe (1985) .... Don Paolo Monti
Un complicato intrigo di donne vicoli e delitti (1986) .... Tango
D'Annunzio (1987) .... Ercole Leoni
Rimini Rimini (1987) .... Carlo Pedercini / Engineer
Topo Galileo (1987)
Francesco (1989) .... Francesco's Father
Eleonora Pimentel (1990, TV Movie) .... The Judge
Flight from Paradise (1990) .... Eliah
Chi tocca muore (1991)
Night on Earth (Tassisti di notte) (1991) .... Priest
Johnny Stecchino (1992) .... D'Agata
Io speriamo che me la cavo (1992) .... Ludovico Mazzullo
Mille bolle blu (1993) .... Mario Gora
L'orso di peluche (1994) .... Novacek
Tutti gli anni una volta l'anno (1994) .... Romano
 (1994) .... Prof. Zigote
Vacanze di Natale '95 (1995) .... Paolone
La sindrome di Stendhal (1996) .... Dr. Cavanna
Il figlio di Bakunin (1997) .... Giudice
Panni sporchi (1999, regia di Mario Monicelli) .... Amedeo
Una furtiva lacrima (1999)
Scarlet Diva (2000) .... Swiss Journalist
Gli astronomi (2002)
The accidental detective (2003) .... Direttore della Galleria Palatina
A.A.A. Achille (2003) .... Dott. Aglieri
13 at a Table (2004) .... Nonno Giulio
Mission: Impossible III (2006) .... Monsignore
Un attimo sospesi (2006) .... Professore
The American (2010) .... Father Benedetto
La macchinazione (2016)
Magical Nights (2018) .... Ennio

References

External links

1937 births
20th-century Italian male actors
Living people
Male actors from Rome
Accademia Nazionale di Arte Drammatica Silvio D'Amico alumni
Nastro d'Argento winners
Ciak d'oro winners
21st-century Italian male actors